Phyllodactylus xanti is a species of lizard in the family Phyllodactylidae. It is endemic to northwestern Mexico. It is also known as the leaf-toed gecko (among many other species) or Raza Island leaf-toed gecko when referring to the subspecies from the Isla Rasa; at present, there are altogether four recognized subspecies, while several more have been recognized previously.

Geographic range
P. xanti is found in the Baja California Peninsula and associated islands in Mexico. Records from southern California (USA) refer to Phyllodactylus nocticolus, first described as Phyllodactylus xanti nocticolus, now considered a distinct species.

Habitat
The preferred natural habitats of P. xanti are desert and shrubland.

Description
P. xanti has vertical pupils, immovable eyelids, and leaf-like toe pads. It has a brownish, grey, or pinkish dorsum, with a light venter. The granular dorsal scales are interspersed with tubercles.

It often squeaks when handled, and it has a very fragile tail which is readily lost.

This gecko is between 2.5 and 6.2 cm (1.5 and 2.5 inches) in snout-to-vent length (SVL).

Reproduction
P. xanti is oviparous.

Subspecies
Four subspecies are recognized as being valid, including the nominotypical subspecies.
Phyllodactylus xanti acorius 
Phyllodactylus xanti sloani 
Phyllodactylus xanti xanti 
Phyllodactylus xanti zweifeli

Etymology
The specific epithet, xanti, commemorate John Xantus, a nineteenth century naturalist active in the United States of America.

The subspecific names, sloani and zweifeli, are in honor of American herpetologists Allan John Sloan and Richard G. Zweifel, respectively.

Taxonomy
The accepted scientific name and original description were published in 1863 by Edward Drinker Cope.

References

Further reading
Behler JL, King FW (1979). The Audubon Society Field Guide to North American Reptiles and Amphibians. New York: Alfred A. Knopf. 743 pp. . (Phyllodactylus xanti, p. 494 + Plate 391).
Bostic DL (1971). "Herpetofauna of the Pacific coast of north central Baja California, Mexico, with a description of a new subspecies of Phyllodactylus xanti ". Transactions of the San Diego Society of Natural History 16: 237–263. (Phyllodactylus xanti sloani, new subspecies, pp. 252–254, Figures 7–8).
Cope ED (1863). "Descriptions of new American SQUAMATA, in the Museum of the Smithsonian Institution, Washington". Proceedings of the Academy of Natural Sciences of Philadelphia 15: 100–106. (Phyllodactylus xanti, new species, pp. 102–103).
 (Phyllodactylus xanti zweifeli, new subspecies, pp. 59–62).
Dixon JR (1966). "Speciation and systematics of the gekkonid lizard genus Phyllodactylus of the Islands of the Gulf of California". Proceedings of the California Academy of Sciences, Fourth Series 33 (13): 415–452. (Phyllodactylus xanti acorius, new subspecies, pp. 442–443).
Smith HM, Brodie ED Jr (1982). Reptiles of North America: A Guide to Field Identification. New York: Golden Press. 240 pp. . (Phyllodactylus xanti, pp. 70–71).
Stebbins RC (2003). A Field Guide to Western Reptiles and Amphibians, Third Edition. The Peterson Field Guide Series ®. Boston and New York: Houghton Mifflin. xiii + 533 pp. . (Phyllodactylus xanti, p. 266 + Plate 24 + Map 73).

Phyllodactylus
Endemic fauna of the Baja California Peninsula
Endemic reptiles of Mexico
Reptiles described in 1863
Taxa named by Edward Drinker Cope
Fauna of Gulf of California islands